Saint-Jean Airport  is located in the southwestern section of the city of Saint-Jean-sur-Richelieu, Quebec, Canada. The airport handles general aviation traffic and is also the main site of the annual International Balloon Festival of Saint-Jean-sur-Richelieu. Summer also sees a major increase in the number of movements due to the Royal Canadian Air Cadets glider center held at the airport.

History
The airfield was constructed in 1941 as part of the British Commonwealth Air Training Plan. No. 9 AOS (Air Observers School) operated here from 7 July 1941 to 30 April 1945.

See also
 List of airports in the Montreal area

References

Transport in Saint-Jean-sur-Richelieu
Buildings and structures in Saint-Jean-sur-Richelieu
Certified airports in Montérégie
Aviation history of Canada
Saint-Jean
BCATP